Rosy is a 2018 American romantic comedy thriller film written and directed by Jess Bond. It stars Nat Wolff, Stacy Martin, Tony Shalhoub, and Johnny Knoxville. It was released via digital and on-demand platforms on July 17, 2018, by The Orchard.

Cast
 Nat Wolff as Doug
 Stacy Martin as Rosy Monroe
 Tony Shalhoub as Dr. Godin
 Johnny Knoxville as James
 Chukwudi Iwuji as Manager
 Adam David Thompson as Eddie
 Alex Karpovsky as Marty

Production
In November 2015, it was announced Nat Wolff had been cast in the film, with Jess Bond directing from a screenplay she wrote, while Jonathan Schwartz served as a producer. In March 2016, it was announced Sky Ferreira had joined the cast of the film in an undisclosed role but she had dropped out later for unknown reasons.

Release
The film was released on July 17, 2018, by The Orchard.

References

External links
 

2018 films
2018 independent films
2010s comedy thriller films
2018 romantic comedy films
2010s romantic thriller films
American comedy thriller films
American independent films
American romantic comedy films
American romantic thriller films
Films about actors
Films about kidnapping
Films produced by Jonathan Schwartz
2010s English-language films
2010s American films